Aparna Sen is an Indian filmmaker, screenwriter and actress who is known for her work in Bengali cinema. A leading actress of the late 1960s and 1970s she has received eight BFJA Awards, five for best actress, two for best supporting actress and one for lifetime achievement. She is the winner of nine National Film Awards and nine international film festival awards for her direction in films. She was awarded the Padma Shri, the fourth highest civilian award, by the government of India in 1987.

Sen made her debut in Teen Kanya (1961) . She went on to establish herself as a leading actress of Bengali Cinema with the films  Ekhane Pinjar (1971), Ekhoni (1971), Jay Jayanti (1971), Memshaheb (1972), Jiban Saikate (1972), Basanta Bilap (1973), Sonar Khancha (1973), Sujata (1974), Alor Thikana (1974), Kajallata (1975), Raag Anuraag (1975), Jana Aranya (1976), Ajasra Dhanyobad (1977), Proxy (1977), Mohonar Dike (1984), Ekanto Apon (1987), Swet Patharer Thala (1992). She also garnered critical acclaim for her work in Indira (1984), Kari Diye Kinlam (1989), Ek Din Achanak (1999), Mahaprithibi (1991), Unishe April (1995), Paromitar Ek Din (2000), Titli (2001), Antaheen (2009), Chatushkon (2014).

In addition to acting in films, Aparna Sen has also been directing films since 1981, starting with 36 Chowringhee Lane for which she won National Film Award (India) for Best Director. She went on to achieve further success in direction with films Paroma, Sati, Yugant, Paromitar Ek Din, Mr. and Mrs. Iyer, 15 Park Avenue, The Japanese Wife, Iti Mrinalini and Goynar Baksho. She won her second National Film Award as a director for Mr. and Mrs. Iyer.

Films as an actress

Writer and director

References

Indian filmographies
Actress filmographies